Gisela Eva Margareta Thidholm (23 June 1930 – 6 May 2009) was a Swedish freestyle swimmer who won a bronze medal in the 4×100 m relay at the  1950 European Aquatics Championships. She competed at the 1948 Olympics in the 400 m and 4×100 m events, but failed to reach the finals.

References

1930 births
2009 deaths
Swedish female freestyle swimmers
Olympic swimmers of Sweden
Swimmers at the 1948 Summer Olympics
European Aquatics Championships medalists in swimming
Sportspeople from Malmö
20th-century Swedish women